Mount Tabor is an important Biblical site located in Lower Galilee, Israel.

Mount Tabor may also refer to:

Other mountains
 Le Tabor, a mountain in the Isère department of France
 Mount Tabor (Oregon), an extinct volcano and park in Portland, Oregon
 Mount Tabor (British Columbia), a mountain near Prince George, British Columbia

Places

Ethiopia
 Debre Tabor (Amharic for Mount Tabor), a town and woreda in Ethiopia

Germany
Montabaur, a town

United Kingdom
 Mount Tabor, West Yorkshire, a hamlet

United States
 Mount Tabor, Indiana, an unincorporated community
 Mount Tabor, New Jersey, a historic neighborhood in the town of Parsippany-Troy Hills
 Mount Tabor, Ohio, an unincorporated community
 Mount Tabor, Portland, Oregon, a neighborhood of Portland
 Mount Tabor, Pennsylvania, an unincorporated community
 Mount Tabor, Vermont, a town
 Mount Tabor, Wisconsin, an unincorporated community

Churches
 Mount Tabor Methodist Episcopal Church (Crownsville, Maryland)
 Mount Tabor Methodist Episcopal Church (West Liberty, Ohio)
 Mt. Tabor Baptist Church, Lewisburg, West Virginia

Other uses
 Battle of Mount Tabor (1799), won by Napoleon over the Ottomans
 Battle of Mount Tabor (biblical), in the Book of Judges
 Mount Tabor Indian Community, Texas
 Mount Tabor (NJT station), a New Jersey Transit station in Denville
 Mount Tabor High School, in Winston-Salem, North Carolina
 Taaborinvuori (literally translated Mount Tabor), a museum and outdoor theatre area in Nurmijärvi, Finland

See also
 Tabor (disambiguation)